Victoria Elizabeth Coren Mitchell ( Coren; born ) is a British writer, TV presenter and professional poker player. She writes weekly columns for The Daily Telegraph and has hosted the BBC television quiz show Only Connect since 2008.

Early life
Victoria Elizabeth Coren was born in Hammersmith, West London, the only daughter of the humourist and journalist Alan Coren and Anne Kasriel. Her father had been brought up in an Orthodox Jewish household. She grew up in Cricklewood, North London, with her elder brother, journalist Giles Coren. She is related to Canadian journalist Michael Coren.

She attended independent girls' schools between the ages of five and 18, including St Paul's Girls' School, and read English at St John's College, Oxford.

Writing
At the age of 14, Coren had a short story published under a pseudonym in Just Seventeen magazine and then won a competition in The Daily Telegraph to write a column about teenage life for their "Weekend" section, which she continued writing during her own teenage years. During a Channel 4 broadcast, she explained that one Telegraph reader had written to her, criticising her column and had used a very great number of swear words, all in Latin.

Her books include Love 16 and Once More, with Feeling, about her attempt (with co-author Charlie Skelton) to make "the greatest porn film ever". Their jobs reviewing porn films for the Erotic Review led them to believe that most of what they were watching was terrible and that they could make better films themselves.

She adapted the newspaper columns of John Diamond into a play called A Lump in my Throat, which was performed during the 2000 Edinburgh Festival at the Assembly Rooms, the Grace Theatre and the New End Theatre in London, before she adapted it again for a BBC Two docudrama with Neil Pearson, broadcast in 2001.

Victoria and Giles Coren wrote an introduction to Chocolate and Cuckoo Clocks, an anthology of the best comic writing by their father Alan, published by Canongate in October 2008.

Her poker memoir For Richer, For Poorer: A Love Affair with Poker (the subtitle changed to Confessions of a Player when released in paperback in 2011) was published in September 2009, and was well reviewed in The Times and The Observer.

Ormerod hoax
In 2007, after the death of her father, having put a notice in The Times inviting those who knew him to attend a service, she was warned by a friend that a "gang of serial funeral crashers" based in the south of England were checking death notices to find funerals and memorial services to crash for their own enjoyment. After receiving some suspicious email replies to her notice, she instigated a hoax to trap the group. She created "Sir William Ormerod" and placed a death notice. A week later, she placed another notice in The Times "in the guise of his grieving boyfriend Peter" for his memorial service "followed by a drinks reception". She reported that the group duly claimed to have known Ormerod and applied for tickets.

After first suggesting holding the memorial service and putting laxative in the canapés, she got a friend to telephone the ringleader (a serial fraudster and ex-magistrate) to let it be known that she knew who they were and that he was not welcome, but she let the others in the gang come to her father's service, "gave them a drink and sent them on their way". She has written articles in the Observer and The Guardian about her experience.

Poker
Coren Mitchell was the first woman to win an event on the European Poker Tour, the first player to win both a televised professional tournament (EPT London 2006) and a televised celebrity tournament (Celebrity Poker Club 2005), and the first player to win two European Poker Tour Main Events (EPT London 2006 and EPT Sanremo 2014). She frequently plays Texas hold 'em at the Victoria Casino in London's Edgware Road. As a commentator/presenter she has presented William Hill Poker Grand Prix 2 (Sky Sports) and Late Night Poker and The Poker Nations Cup for Channel 4, and World Poker Tour for ITV2; and has commentated on The Monte Carlo EPT, Grosvenor UK Poker Tour (Channel 4), Ultimate Poker Challenge (Channel 5).

During her poker career, she has become a close friend of The Hendon Mob and mixes weekly home games with frequent visits to two regular casinos. She appeared in five episodes of Late Night Poker, although she never made it to a series grand final. However, in Late Night Poker's spin-off Celebrity Poker Club, she defeated Willie Thorne to win the series two grand final before joining Jesse May as the commentator in series three. In the 2003 Hold-Em 100 tournament in London, she was a guest dealer for the final table.

On 24 September 2006 she won the main event of the European Poker Tour London, earning a prize of £500,000 and defeating Australian professional Emad Tahtouh. On 20 November 2011 she finished second in the International Federation of Poker's inaugural The Table World Championship, eventually losing heads-up with 29-year-old Spaniard Raul Mestre. She received $100,000 for second place, $10,000 of which she donated to Age UK. In April 2014 she won the main event of the European Poker Tour San Remo, earning €476,100 and becoming the first player to have won two EPT titles.  her total live tournament winnings exceed $2,500,000, making her the 14th best-earning female live poker player ever.

She has been a member of Team PokerStars Pro, but in November 2014 she removed her endorsement a few hours after PokerStars had announced they were starting an online casino. She said she was uncomfortable about potential addiction by vulnerable people to a site where the odds are in favour of the operator, and did not want to be associated with such an operation.

She has said that she regularly stays up until 6am, "Smoking and drinking and gambling. But I like cooking and gardening too, which makes me sound like a very strange mix of an old lady and teenage boy." When asked about this in 2012, she stated: "It is still true. I'll grow up one day, but not quite yet."

Coren Mitchell was inducted into the Women in Poker Hall of Fame in 2016.

Personal life
On 20 March 2012, Coren announced her engagement to actor and comedian David Mitchell. According to David, they first met at a film premiere in 2007, and had a short-lived series of dates, but only began dating properly three years later. The couple married in November 2012, in north London, and their daughter was born in May 2015.

In July 2012 she reported that she was terrified of flying, and in August 2012 she tweeted that the therapist she was seeing to address her fear had been killed in a plane crash.

Television and radio credits

References

External links

 Official website
 

1972 births
Alumni of St John's College, Oxford
British gambling writers
English columnists
English game show hosts
English people of Jewish descent
Poker players from London
European Poker Tour winners
Female poker players
Journalists from London
Living people
People from Hammersmith
Poker commentators
The Guardian journalists
The Observer people
People from Cricklewood
British women columnists
Coren family